Schmidt's blind snake (Afrotyphlops schmidti, formerly Typhlops schmidti) is a species of snake in the family Typhlopidae. The species is endemic to Central and Southern Africa.

Etymology
The specific name, schmidti, is in honor of American herpetologist Karl Patterson Schmidt.

Subspecies
Two subspecies are recognized:

Geographic range
A. schmidti is found in Angola, Zambia, and eastern and southern Democratic Republic of the Congo (formerly known as Zaire).

Reproduction
A. schmidti is oviparous.

References

Further reading
Hedges SB, Marion AB, Lipp KM, Marin J, Vidal N (2014). "A taxonomic framework for typhlopid snakes from the Caribbean and other regions (Reptilia, Squamata)". Caribbean Herpetology (49): 1-61. (Afrotyphlops schmidti, new combination).
Laurent RF (1956). "Contribution à l'herpétologie de la région des Grandes Lacs de l'Afrique centrale". Annales du Musée royal de Congo belge (Sciences Zoologiques) 48: 1–390. (Typhlops schmidti, new species, p. 71). (in French).
Wallach V (2003). "Scolecophidia miscellanea ". Hamadryad 27 (2): 222–240. (Rhinotyphlops schmidti, new combination, p. 232).

schmidti
Snakes of Africa
Reptiles of Angola
Reptiles of the Democratic Republic of the Congo
Reptiles of Zambia
Reptiles described in 1956
Taxa named by Raymond Laurent